Emma Matilda Lake is located in Grand Teton National Park, in the U. S. state of Wyoming. The lake is named after the wife of William O. Owen who was the first, along with three other climbers, to ascend to the summit of Grand Teton in 1898. The  Emma Matilda Lake Trail circles the lake and offers distant views of the Teton Range.

See also
Geology of the Grand Teton area

Cited references

Lakes of Grand Teton National Park
Lakes of Wyoming